The Great Gamble: The Soviet War in Afghanistan is a 2009 book by Gregory Feifer about the 1979-1989 Soviet–Afghan War.

References

Books about the Cold War
Books about Afghanistan
2009 non-fiction books